Demetrius Korderas (born March 19, 1962), better known by his referee name, Jimmy Korderas, is a Canadian professional wrestling referee, commentator and television personality who currently works for Canadian TV sports network Sportsnet. He is best known for his 22-year tenure in WWE from 1987 to 2009.

Professional wrestling career

Early career
Korderas began working as a professional wrestling referee in 1985 at Maple Leaf Gardens. At first, he was hired as a driver by his friend Elio Zarlenga.  At the time, Zarlenga was second in command only to Jack Tunney, and suggested making Korderas a referee. His first match was between Special Delivery Jones and Red Demon.

World Wrestling Federation/Entertainment (1987–2009)

On May 23, 1999, Korderas was the referee at Over the Edge for the match between "Blue Blazer" Owen Hart and The Godfather. He was in the ring when Hart fell 75 feet from a harness tethered above the ring and died. According to reports, Hart yelled to Korderas to move because Hart did not want to land on Korderas, but Hart's foot still made contact with Korderas' shoulder.

During a kayfabe strike by the WWF referees in late 1999, Korderas was the only regular referee who did not join the strike, which led to him being attacked by the striking refs at Unforgiven in 1999.

In 2006, the WWE pulled Korderas off the road briefly due to health issues, but he returned to work shortly thereafter. In November 2008, referees, and thus Korderas, were made no longer exclusive to particular WWE television shows, or brands. On January 9, 2009, Korderas was released from WWE.

Ring of Honor (2012)
On May 12, 2012, Korderas refereed a match at Ring of Honor's Internet Pay-Per View entitled Border Wars. Jimmy was heralded by fans chanting "Thank you, Jimmy" when he entered the ring.

Personal life
After leaving WWE, Korderas began spending more time with his wife and family, as well as taking classes in broadcasting.

After meeting Arda Ocal, then of Sportsnet 360, Ocal brought him on as an analyst on "Right After Wrestling" on SIRIUS Radio, and also secured him a spot on the Aftermath Television Program, which Korderas is still a part of today.

Korderas published a book on his life and career, called "The Three Count - my life in stripes as a WWE referee" The foreword was written by Adam Copeland (Edge) and was released on April 1, 2013 by ECW Press.

Championships and accomplishments
New England Pro Wrestling Hall of Fame
Class of 2015

Notes

External links

 Profile at onlineworldofwrestling.com
 SLAM! Wrestling Canadian Hall of Fame

1962 births
Living people
Canadian people of Greek descent
Professional wrestling referees